Boreas may refer to:

 Boreas (god), Greek god of the north wind
 Boreas (film), 2006 Turkish short drama film
 Boreas (journal), academic journal that covers all branches of Quaternary research
 Boreas (restaurant), Dutch Michelin starred restaurant
 Boreas (storm), November 2013 storm
 Boreas (painting), a 1903 oil painting by John William Waterhouse
 1916 Boreas, an asteroid

See also
Borea (disambiguation)
Boreal (disambiguation)